This is a complete list of the plays of the Austrian singer-actor-playwright Johann Nestroy (1801–1862).

Genres 
Out of the 83 recorded works of Nestroy, a total of some 56 were designated as some form of Posse, meaning a farce or 'broad comedy', including 32 Possen mit Gesang (farce with singing). There are eight Parodien, or parodies (two of them also designated as Possen), plus two Burlesken and one 'Travestie'). There are 6 Zauberspiele and 4 Quodlibet, 2 Vorspiele (prologues) and also one each of the following: Dramatisches Gemälde ('dramatic picture'), Historisch-romantisches Drama ('historical-romantic drama'), Intermezzo, Komische Szenenreihe ('comic parade'), Operette, and Schwank ('humorous story').

List

References
 Branscombe, Peter (1992), "Nestroy, Johann Nepomuk" in The New Grove Dictionary of Opera, ed. Stanley Sadie (London) 
 International Nestroy Centre list of works, accessed 21 February 2011 

Nestroy